Ioannis Andreas Kargas (died on 2 October 1617) was a Catholic bishop of the Roman Catholic Diocese of Syros and Milos from 1607 to 1617. During the invasion of the Turks in 1617, under the leadership of the Kapudan Pasha Çelebi Ali, Kargas was captured and hanged. His name has been given to the street that leads to the stairs of Ano Syros.

References

External links
 http://www.catholic-hierarchy.org/bishop/bcargaga.html

17th-century Roman Catholic bishops in Greece
Executed Greek people
1617 deaths
17th-century Roman Catholic bishops in the Republic of Venice
People from Syros
Year of birth unknown